The Archbishopric of Tuam existed from the mid twelfth century until 1839, with its seat at Tuam.

St Jarlath (c. 445–540) is considered to have founded Tuam as the seat of a bishop in about 501, and he stands first in the list of bishops of Tuam. However, the names of only two other bishops are recorded before the eleventh century, Ferdomnach (died 781) and Eugene mac Clerig (died 969).

Tuam achieved a new importance after it became the seat of the O'Connor High Kings of Ireland in the early 11th century. The O'Connors had previously been based at Cruachain, County Roscommon. The first St Mary's Cathedral on the present site was begun in the 12th century, when Turlough O'Connor (1088–1156) was High King. This marked Tuam's becoming the seat of an Archbishop, following the Synod of Kells of 1152.

With the Reformation, the new Church of Ireland established its own archdiocese, which was separate from the authority of the Pope. This archdiocese became the central part of the new Province of Tuam, an ecclesiastical province of the Church of Ireland, so continuing until the nineteenth century. In 1839, on the death of the last archbishop, Dr Power Trench, Tuam lost its metropolitan status, as a consequence of the Church Temporalities Act, and united with the see of Killala and Achonry. At the same time, the diocese of Ardagh was separated from it and united with Kilmore.

The former Ecclesiastical province of Tuam now forms part of the Church of Ireland Diocese of Tuam, Killala and Achonry in the united Province of Armagh and Tuam.

Church of Ireland archbishops of Tuam

The following is a basic list of the Church of Ireland archbishops of Tuam.

1514-1536: Thomas O'Mullaly
1537-1572: Christopher Bodkin
1572-1595: William O'Mullally
1595-1609: Nehemiah Donnellan
1609-1628: William Daniel
1629-1638: Randolph Barlow
1638-1645: Richard Boyle
1645-1647: John Maxwell
1647-1660: See vacant
1660-1667: Samuel Pullen
1667-1679: John Parker
1679-1716: John Vesey
1716-1741: Edward Synge
1742-1751: Josiah Hort
1752-1775: John Ryder
1775-1782: Jemmett Browne
1782-1794: Joseph Deane Bourke
1794-1819: William Beresford
1819-1839: Power Le Poer Trench

Loss of metropolitan status
The Church Temporalities (Ireland) Act 1833 combined the Church of Ireland Archdiocese of Tuam with the Diocese of Killala and Achonry on 13 April 1834. However, Tuam retained its metropolitan status until the death of the incumbent Archbishop, Dr William Power Le Poer Trench, in 1839.

See also
 Archdiocese of Tuam (Roman Catholic)
 Diocese of Tuam, Killala and Achonry (CoI)
 Dean of Tuam
 Archdeacon of Tuam

References

Diocese of Tuam, Killala and Achonry